Mark Hartill (born 29 May 1964) is an Australian former Rugby Union prop. He was a member of the Australian squad at the 1987 and 1995 Rugby World Cup. He went on to win 20 caps between 1986 and 1995.

References

External links

Living people
Australian rugby union players
Australia international rugby union players
Rugby union props
1964 births